Ambodiangezoka is a commune in northern Madagascar. It belongs to the district of Andapa, which is a part of Sava Region. According to 2001 census the population of Ambodiangezoka was 26,673.

Primary and junior level secondary education are available in town. The majority 95% of the population are farmers.  The most important crops are rice and vanilla, while other important agricultural products are coffee and beans.  Services provide employment for 5% of the population.

References and notes 

Populated places in Sava Region